Hamza Sakhi (born 7 June 1996) is a Moroccan professional footballer who plays for AJ Auxerre as an attacking midfielder.

Club career
Having initially joined AJ Auxerre from Metz on loan, Auxerre confirmed they had signed Sakhi on a permanent deal on 16 April 2018.

In January 2019, he went on loan to FC Sochaux-Montbéliard.

His younger half-brother Ilyas Chouaref is also a footballer.

International career
Sakhi was born in Rabat, Morocco, but was raised in France. He made his debut for Morocco in a 4–2 2013 FIFA U-17 World Cup win against the Panama U17s, wherein he scored his debut goal.

Career statistics

References

External links
 
 

1996 births
Living people
People from Châteauroux
Sportspeople from Indre
French sportspeople of Moroccan descent
Moroccan footballers
French footballers
Footballers from Centre-Val de Loire
Association football midfielders
Morocco youth international footballers
Ligue 1 players
Ligue 2 players
Championnat National players
Championnat National 3 players
LB Châteauroux players
FC Metz players
SAS Épinal players
AJ Auxerre players
FC Sochaux-Montbéliard players